Lakatnik Point, Smith Island  
 Laki Peak, Nordenskjöld Coast  
 Lale Buttress, Davis Coast
 Lamantin Island, Wilhelm Archipelago
 Lambreva Beach, Nelson Island
 Lambuh Knoll, Trinity Peninsula
 Lamya Island, Wilhelm Archipelago  
 Landreth Glacier, Smith Island
 Lapa Island, Wilhelm Archipelago 
 Lapteva Island, Anvers Island
 Lardeya Ice Piedmont, Sentinel Range 
 Lardigo Peak, Trinity Peninsula  
 Laskar Point, Graham Coast
 Latinka Cove, Danco Coast
 Lavrenov Point, Robert Island  
 Lazuren Bryag Cove, South Orkney Islands
 Lebed Point, Clarence Island
 Ledenika Peak, Trinity Peninsula  
 Leeve Island, Robert Island
 Lenoir Rock, Smith Island
 Lepitsa Peak, Trinity Peninsula 
 Leppe Island, Biscoe Islands
 Leshko Point, Liège Island
 Lesicheri Glacier, Oscar II Coast 
 Lesidren Island, Zed Islands  
 Leslie Gap, Livingston Island  
 Lesnovo Hill, Alexander Island
 Lesura Cove, Two Hummock Island
 Letnitsa Glacier, Smith Island  
 Levenov Point, Brabant Island
 Levski Peak, Livingston Island  
 Levski Ridge, Livingston Island 
 Leyka Lake, Nelson Island 
 Limets Peninsula, Low Island
 Limoza Island, D'Urville Island
 Linevo Cove, Smith Island
 Linus Beach, Snow Island
 Linzipar Lake, Livingston Island
 Lipen Glacier, Anvers Island  
 Lisiya Ridge, Graham Coast  
 Liverpool Beach, Livingston Island  
 Mount Llana, Clarence Island
 Lobosh Buttress, Trinity Peninsula  
 Lom Peak, Livingston Island  
 Long Beach, Nelson Island
 Lopyan Crag, Trinity Peninsula
 Lorna Cove, Trinity Island  
 Lovech Heights, Nordenskjöld Coast
 Lozen Nunatak, Livingston Island  
 Lozen Saddle, Livingston Island  
 Ludogorie Peak, Livingston Island  
 Lukovit Point, Livingston Island  
 Lukovo Point, Livingston Island
 Luna Island, Biscoe Islands
 Lyaskovets Peak, Livingston Island
 Lyubimets Nunatak, Alexander Island  
 Lyulin Peak, Livingston Island  
 Lyutibrod Rocks, Low Island
 Lyutitsa Nunatak, Greenwich Island

See also 
 Bulgarian toponyms in Antarctica

External links 
 Bulgarian Antarctic Gazetteer
 SCAR Composite Gazetteer of Antarctica
 Antarctic Digital Database (ADD). Scale 1:250000 topographic map of Antarctica with place-name search.
 L. Ivanov. Bulgarian toponymic presence in Antarctica. Polar Week at the National Museum of Natural History in Sofia, 2–6 December 2019

Bibliography 
 J. Stewart. Antarctica: An Encyclopedia. Jefferson, N.C. and London: McFarland, 2011. 1771 pp.  
 L. Ivanov. Bulgarian Names in Antarctica. Sofia: Manfred Wörner Foundation, 2021. Second edition. 539 pp.  (in Bulgarian)
 G. Bakardzhieva. Bulgarian toponyms in Antarctica. Paisiy Hilendarski University of Plovdiv: Research Papers. Vol. 56, Book 1, Part A, 2018 – Languages and Literature, pp. 104-119 (in Bulgarian)
 L. Ivanov and N. Ivanova. Bulgarian names. In: The World of Antarctica. Generis Publishing, 2022. pp. 114-115. 

Antarctica
 
Bulgarian toponyms in Antarctica
Names of places in Antarctica